Warren Douglas (born Warren Douglas Wandberg; July 29, 1911 – November 15, 1997) was an American actor and screenwriter.

Career
Born in Minneapolis, Douglas was a 1929 graduate of Minneapolis South High School. He later attended the Minneapolis College of Music.

Douglas' work on stage included work in local theater and acting in productions in summer stock theater. On Broadway, he had the role of Alec Dixon in Happily Ever After (1945).

Beginning in the 1950s, Douglas focused his efforts more on writing than on acting. He wrote two novels, The Man from Wells Fargo, and One Came Alone, in addition to 48 teleplays and screenplays. He also wrote the lyrics and books for the musicals Belle Starr, Go for Your Gun, and The Peaceful Palace.

On November 15, 1997, Douglas died of heart failure at the Kit Carson Rest Home in Jackson, California, at age 86.

Partial filmography

 First Offenders (1939) – Tom
 City for Conquest (1940) – Elevator Operator (uncredited)
 Air Force (1943) – Hickam Field Control Officer (uncredited)
 Mission to Moscow (1943) – Emlen's Well-Wisher at Train Station (uncredited)
 Action in the North Atlantic (1943) – Navy Pilot (uncredited)
 Murder on the Waterfront (1943) – Joey Davis
 Adventure in Iraq (1943) – Doug Everett
 Northern Pursuit (1943) – Sergeant (scenes deleted)
 Destination Tokyo (1943) – Larry
 God Is My Co-Pilot (1945) – Bob Neale
 Pride of the Marines (1945) – Kebabian
 Below the Deadline (1946) – Joe Hilton
 The Inner Circle (1946) – Johnny Strange
 The Magnificent Rogue (1946) – Steve Morgan
 The Man I Love (1947) – Joe Brown
 The Pilgrim Lady (1947) – Dennis Carter
 High Conquest (1947) – Geoffrey Stevens
 The Trespasser (1947) – Danny 'Dan' Butler
 The Chinese Ring (1947) – Police Sgt. Bill Davidson
 Lightnin' in the Forest (1948) – David Lamont
 The Babe Ruth Story (1948) – Boston Braves' Rookie
 Incident (1949) – Joe Downey
 Homicide for Three (1948) – Lt. Peter Duluth
 Homicide (1949) – Brad Clifton
 Forgotten Women (1949) – John Allison
 Task Force (1949) – Winston – CIC Officer (uncredited)
 Post Office Investigator (1949) – Bill Mannerson
 Square Dance Katy (1950) – Bob Carson
 The Great Jewel Robber (1950) – Det. Altman (uncredited)
 County Fair (1950) – Tommy Blake
 The Admiral Was a Lady (1950) – Salesman (uncredited)
 Cuban Fireball (1951) – Tommy Pomeroy
 Secrets of Monte Carlo (1951) – Bill Whitfield
 Yellow Fin (1951) – Dr. Steve Elliott
 Northwest Territory (1951) – Dan Morgan
 Torpedo Alley (1952) – Minor Role (uncredited)
 Jack Slade (1953, writer)
 Fangs of the Arctic (1953) – Matt Oliver
 Cry Vengeance (1954) – Mike Walters
 Dragoon Wells Massacre (1957) – Jud
 The Helen Morgan Story (1957) – Mark Hellinger
 The Deep Six (1958) – Pilot
 The Night of the Grizzly (1966) – Minister (uncredited)

References

External links

1911 births
1997 deaths
20th-century American male actors
20th-century American screenwriters
American male film actors
American male television actors
South High School (Minnesota) alumni